A plastic bag is a bag made of thin plastic.

Plastic Bag may also refer to:
Plastic Bag (film)
"Plastic Bag", song by X-Ray Spex from Germ Free Adolescents